Çağlan is a village in Dikili district of İzmir Province, Turkey.  It is situated in the western slopes of the mountainous area. The population of the village is 169 as of 2011.

References

Villages in Dikili District